The Battle of Kjølberg Bridge was fought 14 August 1814, during the Swedish–Norwegian war of 1814. The Swedish army had problems repairing the bridge due to constant fire from the Norwegian side of the river. It was then a small Swedish force of 75 men, consisting of jägers from the Bohuslän and Life Grenadier Regiments, passed over the river at a hidden point. Once over they waited for reinforcements but none came; but instead the order of attacking the vastly larger Norwegian force. The Colonel response to the attack order have been famous "It is unreasonable to attack with only 75 men when you face a whole regiment." "But such an order isn't given to me twice. March!" During cheers the Swedes rushed up the hill toward the mansion that was occupied with 600 men. The attack was surprising and decisive. As more Swedish troops crossed, the Norwegians quickly left the stand. This was the last battle fought during the Swedish–Norwegian War. The Convention of Moss, providing a cease fire agreement, was signed that same day.

The last shots were fired north of the bridge with the Norwegians in retreat.

Notes

References

See also
Norway in 1814
Union between Sweden and Norway

Further reading

External links
Norwegian-Swedish War of 1814 (The Napoleon Series)
Kampene ved Kjølberg bru (Østfoldmuseene Prosjektleder)
The Story of 1814  (Eidsvoll 1814)

1814 in Sweden
1814 in Norway
Conflicts in 1814
Battles involving Sweden
Battles involving Norway
Swedish–Norwegian War (1814)
August 1814 events